WDLX (930 AM) and WGHB (1250 AM) are radio stations broadcasting a sports format.  The WDLX/WGHB simulcast is currently owned by Pirate Media Group.

Licensed to Washington, North Carolina, United States, WDLX serves the Greenville-New Bern area.  The station signed on the air March 3, 1942 as WRRF.  The calls stood for "We Radiate Real Friendship".  In 1962, the call letters were changed to WITN, owing largely to the eyeWITNess news format adopted by owner Bill Roberson's television station, WITN-TV.  Roberson had also signed on sister FM station WITN-FM at 93.3 MHz (today's WERO) on September 6, 1961.  These stations shared the same callsigns on FM and AM until 1985, when the FM facility became WDLX and the AM reverted to the WRRF calls.  They shared the same building until about 2004.

In 1996, new owner Pinnacle Broadcasting changed the calls for WDLX to WERO as the station adopted an Arrow 93.3 moniker and a classic hits format; to protect the copyright to the call letters, they switched WRRF to WDLX, although no change was made in its talk format.

WDLX is today the flagship station for East Carolina University Pirates athletics and also broadcasts Carolina Hurricanes games. Starting in 2010, WDLX aired the Baltimore Orioles.

WGHB is licensed to Farmville, North Carolina and was once WFAG, meaning "Watch Farmville Area Grow". It exists mainly to improve WDLX' nighttime coverage in the Greenville area. WDLX must adjust its coverage to protect a silent clear-channel station in Montreal at AM 940, limiting its nighttime coverage to the immediate area around Washington.

These two stations are not related to pirate radio, deriving their name instead from the East Carolina Pirates.

References

External links
Official website

Sports radio stations in the United States
DLX
Radio stations established in 1942
1942 establishments in North Carolina